Elections to Stirling Council were held on 3 May 2007, the same day as the other Scottish local government elections and the Scottish Parliament general election. The election was the first one using seven new wards created as a result of the Local Governance (Scotland) Act 2004. Each ward elected three or four councillors using the single transferable vote system form of proportional representation. The new wards replaced 22 single-member wards which used the plurality (first past the post) system of election.

Election results

Ward results

By-elections since 2007
 Labour's Bannockburn councillor Gerard O'Brien resigned, having been found guilty of breaches of the Councillors Code of Conduct. Violet Weir held the seat for the party on 30 April 2009.

References

2007
2007 Scottish local elections